El Banco (meaning River bank in Spanish) is a Colombian Municipality and town located in the southernmost part of the Magdalena Department by the Magdalena River.

River

El Banco, Magdalena has a river named
Magdalena River(Spanish name is Río Magdalena) has been a major commercial artery since the Spanish conquest. On keelboats, goods were transported from colonial times to the 19th century.

Climate
El Banco has a tropical monsoon climate (Am) with little to moderate rainfall from December to March and heavy rainfall in the remaining months.

References

External links
El Banco official website

Municipalities of Magdalena Department